Phosphorus trioxide is the chemical compound with the molecular formula P4O6.  Although the molecular formula suggests the name tetraphosphorus hexaoxide, the name phosphorus trioxide preceded the knowledge of the compound's molecular structure, and its usage continues today.  This colorless solid is structurally related to adamantane.  It is formally the anhydride of phosphorous acid, H3PO3, but cannot be obtained by the dehydration of the acid.  A white solid that melts at room temperature, it is waxy, crystalline and highly toxic, with garlic odour.

Preparation 
It is obtained by the combustion of phosphorus in a limited supply of air at low temperatures.
P4 + 3 O2 → P4O6

By-products include red phosphorus suboxide.

Chemical properties 
Phosphorus trioxide reacts with water to form phosphorous acid, reflecting the fact that it is the anhydride of that acid.

 P4O6 + 6 H2O  →   4 H3PO3

It reacts with hydrogen chloride to form H3PO3 and phosphorus trichloride.

 P4O6 + 6 HCl → 2 H3PO3 + 2 PCl3

With chlorine or bromine it forms the corresponding phosphoryl halide, and it reacts with iodine in a sealed tube to form diphosphorus tetraiodide.

P4O6 reacts with ozone at 195 K to give the unstable compound P4O18.

P4O18 decomposes above 238 K in solution with the release of O2 gas.  Decomposition of dry P4O18 is explosive.

In a disproportionation reaction, P4O6 is converted into the mixed P(III)P(V) species P4O8 when heated in a sealed tube at 710 K, with the side product being red phosphorus.

As a ligand

P4O6 is a ligand for transition metals, comparable to phosphite. An illustrative complex is P4O6·Fe(CO)4. 
With BH3, a dimeric adduct is produced:

References

Sesquioxides
Adamantane-like molecules
Phosphorus oxides
Phosphorus(III) compounds
Tricyclic compounds